St. Mark's Episcopal Church is a historic Episcopal church located at Kingston, Somerset County, Maryland. It is a single-story one-by-three-bay frame structure in the Greek Revival style, built in 1846 and moved to this site in 1924.  Also on the property is cemetery with about a dozen 19th-century burials.

It was listed on the National Register of Historic Places in 1990.

References

External links

, including undated photo, at Maryland Historical Trust

Churches completed in 1846
1846 establishments in Maryland
19th-century Episcopal church buildings
Episcopal church buildings in Maryland
Churches on the National Register of Historic Places in Maryland
Churches in Somerset County, Maryland
Greek Revival church buildings in Maryland
National Register of Historic Places in Somerset County, Maryland